I'm with You Always is a live album by Mike Bloomfield. It was recorded in 1977 at McCabes Guitar Shop in Santa Monica. It was originally released as a CD on Demon Records in Europe and finally released in the US in 2008 on the Benchmark Recordings label. Bloomfield shows off his ability to master all forms of blues, from acoustic delta blues, to Chicago electric blues, to full-out blues-rock.

Track listing 
All Songs Traditional, unless otherwise noted

 "Eyesight to the Blind" (Sonny Boy Williamson)
 "Men's Room"
 "Frankie and Johnny"
 "I'm with You Always"
 "Jockey Blues/Old Folks Boogie"
 "Some of These Days"
 "Don't You Lie to Me" 
 "Hymn Time"
 "Darktown Strutter's Ball"
 "Stagger Lee"
 "I'm Glad I'm Jewish" (Mike Bloomfield)
 "A-Flat Boogaloo"

Personnel
Mike Bloomfield - vocals, guitar
Mark Naftalin - piano
Buell Neidlinger - bass
Buddy Helm - drums

References

External links
Official Website

Mike Bloomfield albums
Albums produced by Denny Bruce
2008 live albums
Benchmark Recordings live albums